"Move to Move" is a song by Canadian synth-pop duo Kon Kan, released as the fourth single from their 1989 debut album Move to Move. The song peaked at No. 84 in their native Canada.

"Move to Move" was re-recorded for their 1993 album, Vida!..., titled as "Move to Move (Revisited)". This version has more of a rock sound than the original synthpop version.

Charts

References

1989 songs
1989 singles
Kon Kan songs
Atlantic Records singles